The 1947 Marquette Hilltoppers football team was an American football team that represented Marquette University during the 1947 college football season. In its 17th season under head coach Frank Murray, the team compiled a 4–5 record and was outscored by a total of 223 to 185. The team played its home games at Marquette Stadium in Milwaukee.

Schedule

References

Marquette
Marquette Golden Avalanche football seasons
Marquette Hilltoppers football